The Little River is a  river in the town of York, Maine, that flows directly into the Atlantic Ocean.  It is located north of the York River and south of the Cape Neddick River, reaching the Atlantic near the south end of York Beach.

See also
List of rivers of Maine

References

External links

Maine Streamflow Data from the USGS
Maine Watershed Data From Environmental Protection Agency

Rivers of York County, Maine
York, Maine
Rivers of Maine